The Iraqi no-fly zones conflict was a low-level conflict in the two no-fly zones (NFZs) in Iraq that were proclaimed by the United States, United Kingdom, and France after the Gulf War of 1991. The United States stated that the NFZs were intended to protect the ethnic Kurdish minority in northern Iraq and Shiite Muslims in the south. Iraqi aircraft were forbidden from flying inside the zones. The policy was enforced by the United States and the United Kingdom until 2003, when it was rendered obsolete by the 2003 invasion of Iraq. French aircraft patrols also participated until France withdrew in 1996.

The Iraqi government claimed 1,400 civilians were killed by Coalition bombing during the NFZ. The Kurdish dominated north gained effective autonomy and was protected from a feared repeat of the Anfal  genocide in 1988 that killed tens of thousands of civilians. Over 280,000 sorties were flown in the first 9 years of the NFZs.

This military action was not authorised by the United Nations. The Secretary-General of the UN at the time the resolution was passed, Boutros Boutros-Ghali called the no-fly zones "illegal" in a later interview with John Pilger.

Legality 
The American, British and French governments used United Nations Security Council Resolution 688 to establish no-fly zones with the stated aim to protect humanitarian operations in Iraq, though the resolution made no explicit reference to no-fly zones.

Role in preparation for ground invasion 
From March to December 2002 the number of bombs dropped increased by 300%. This was recognised as "a clear indication that the no-fly zone is being used to destroy the country's air defence systems in anticipation of an all-out attack". Whitehall officials privately admitted to the Guardian that the no-fly zones were being used to weaken Iraq's air defence systems instead of the stated aim of defending the Marsh Arabs and the Shia population of Iraq.

The commander of the USS Abraham Lincoln's air wing said that the NFZ "makes any potential action infinitely easier ... to fly over the same territory you're going to attack is a real luxury".

Civilian deaths 
The United Nations reported that in 1999 alone 144 civilians were killed during Coalition bombing raids. By 1999 over 1,800 bombs had been dropped on Iraq.

The United States and coalition countries denied these allegations and cited popular Kurdish and Shia demands for no-fly zones, in order to protect against Saddam Hussein, who unhindered had committed numerous atrocities a few years earlier, such as the infamous 1988 Anfal genocide that killed 50,000 to 182,000 Kurdish civilians. The establishing of no-fly zones effectively cut off Saddam Hussein from much of the north and secured the Kurdish population, who gained effective autonomy directly following the intervention. This autonomy has continued to thrive and even avoided the chaos and bloodshed that characterized the rest of Iraq during the 2003 Iraq war.

History 

From 1992 to the United States-led coalition invasion of Iraq in 2003, there were two NFZs in Iraq. The NFZ in the north of Iraq was established shortly after the Gulf War, extending from the 36th parallel northwards. In August 1992 the NFZ in the south to the 32nd parallel was established, but in 1996 it was expanded to the 33rd parallel.  The northern NFZ was initially part of Operation Provide Comfort relief operations to a persecuted Kurdish minority in Iraq, and was followed on by Operation Northern Watch. The southern NFZ was maintained by Operation Southern Watch.

When Operation Desert Storm ended in 1991, the safety of Kurds who were fleeing during the uprising from Iraqi persecution became an issue, and Operation Provide Comfort began. This operation essentially created a Northern NFZ to Iraqi military aircraft. The operation provided the Kurdish population with humanitarian aid and reassurance of safe skies.

On 26 June 1993, the U.S. conducted a cruise missile attack on the Iraqi Intelligence Service's (IIS) principal command and control complex in Baghdad, publicly announced as retaliation for the assassination attempt by the IIS on former President George H. W. Bush while he was visiting Kuwait in April of that year to commemorate a coalition victory over Iraq in the Gulf War. Sixteen hit the target, while three struck a residential area, killing nine civilians and wounding 12 others. Four missiles were unaccounted for.

In October 1994, Baghdad once again began mobilizing around 64,000 Iraqi troops near the Kuwaiti border because of their expressed frustrations of economic sanctions imposed on Iraq by the United Nations Security Council (UNSC). In response, the U.S. begins to deploy troops in the Persian Gulf to deter Iraqi aggression against Kuwait. Code-named Operation Vigilant Warrior, 1st Brigade of the Fort Stewart, Georgia-based 24th Infantry Division (Mechanized) deployed and drew pre-positioned equipment in Kuwait. The 23rd Wing's (Flying Tigers) 75th Fighter Squadron (Tigersharks) and its full complement of A-10s initially deployed from Pope AFB, North Carolina to Dhahran Air Base, Saudi Arabia, followed by the first forward deployment to Ahmad al-Jaber Air Base, Kuwait. This allowed better face-to-face coordination with tactical air control parties (TACP) assets further forward deployed at Camp Doha, Kuwait and points north. Iraq would later withdraw troops near the Kuwaiti border in response to a massive U.S. military build-up.

However, this was marred by a friendly-fire incident on 14 April 1994 when two United States Air Force F-15 Eagle fighter planes mistakenly shot down two United States Army Blackhawk helicopters, killing 26 Coalition military and civilian personnel.

A second wave of 17 was launched later that day. The missiles hit targets in and around Kut, Iskandariyah, Nasiriyah, and Tallil. This was done in response to Saddam Hussein, the dictator of Iraq, attempting to launch an Iraqi military offensive campaign in the Kurdish town of Arbil in Iraqi Kurdistan.

Operation Provide Comfort officially ended on 31 December 1996. Following Operation Provide Comfort, the United States continued to watch over the northern skies with the launching of Operation Northern Watch on 1 January 1997. Operation Northern Watch continued to provide air security to the Kurdish population in the north. By 1999, the Department of Defense had flown over 200,000 sorties over Iraq.

American and British aircraft continuously enforced the NFZ, receiving anti-aircraft fire from Iraqi forces almost daily. The operation ran until its conclusion on 1 May 2003. In the south, Operation Southern Watch was underway to watch over the persecuted Shi'ite populations. This operation was launched on 27 August 1992 with the mission of preventing further human rights abuses against civilian populations. Iraq challenged the no-fly zone beginning in December 1992 when a USAF F-16 fighter plane shot down an Iraqi MiG-25 Foxbat fighter which had locked onto it in the Southern no-fly zone. The next month Coalition planes attacked Iraqi SAM sites in the South. Baghdad eventually halted firing on patrolling Coalition aircraft after August 1993.

In December 1998, Operation Desert Fox was conducted by the USAF and the Royal Air Force, which was a major four-day bombing campaign on Iraqi targets from 16 December to 19 December 1998. The contemporaneous justification for the strikes was Iraq's failure to comply with United Nations Security Council resolutions and its interference with United Nations Special Commission inspectors.

In the aftermath of Operation Desert Fox in December 1998, Iraq announced it would no longer respect the no-fly zones and resumed its efforts in shooting down Coalition aircraft. Saddam Hussein offered a $14,000 reward to anyone who could accomplish this task, but no manned aircraft were ever shot down by Iraq. Air strikes by British and American aircraft against Iraqi claimed anti-aircraft and military targets continued weekly over the next few years. In the early 2000s (decade), the U.S. developed a contingency plan, Operation Desert Badger for dealing with pilots shot down over Iraqi no-fly zones.

The operation continued until it transitioned to Operation Southern Focus in June 2002. They began to carry out offensive sorties, not only against targets that had fired on them, but upon installations that had demonstrated no hostile intent. The U.S. claimed that these increased attacks were the result of increasing Iraqi provocations, but later, in July 2005, the British Ministry of Defense released figures showing that the number of provocations had actually dropped dramatically prior to and just after the increase in allied attacks. Their records indicate that in the first seven months of 2001, there had been 370 provocations on the part of Iraq. In the seven months from October 2001 into May 2002, only 32 such provocations were recorded. General Tommy Franks later acknowledged that the dramatic increase in offensive sorties was an attempt to destroy the Iraqi defenses in much the same way as the air strikes at the beginning of the Gulf War had.

In purported retaliation for the Iraqis' now-daily air defense attacks on coalition aircraft, the September attacks included a 5 September 100-aircraft attack on the main air defense site in western Iraq. According to an editorial by Michael Smith for the New Statesman, this was "Located at the furthest extreme of the southern no-fly zone, far away from the areas that needed to be patrolled to prevent attacks on the Shi'a; it was destroyed not because it was a threat to the patrols, but to allow allied special forces operating from Jordan to enter Iraq undetected."

The NFZs effectively ceased to exist with the beginning of the Iraq War in March 2003, since air superiority over the country was quickly attained by the coalition. The NFZs were officially deactivated right after Saddam Hussein's overthrow.

See also 

Iraqi Airways
Iraq sanctions
Post–World War II air-to-air combat losses

References

External links 
Full-text of Resolution 688

1991 establishments in Iraq
2003 disestablishments in Iraq
Iraq War
No-fly zones
Iraq–United States relations
Iraq–United Kingdom relations
No-fly zone operations
France–Iraq relations